Carlos Humberto da Silva Ferreira (born 11 January 1974 in Braga), known as Litos, is a Portuguese former footballer who played as a goalkeeper.

References

External links

1974 births
Living people
Sportspeople from Braga
Portuguese footballers
Association football goalkeepers
Primeira Liga players
Liga Portugal 2 players
Segunda Divisão players
SC Vianense players
F.C. Vizela players
Varzim S.C. players
G.D. Ribeirão players
S.C. Beira-Mar players